Giant's Castle is a mountain  located within the Drakensberg range in KwaZulu-Natal, South Africa. It includes a grassy plateau nestled among the deep valleys of the southern end of the central Drakensberg. Together, the shape of the peaks and escarpment are thought to resemble a sleeping giant's profile; hence, its name.

Giant's Castle is best known for its  nature reserve and the bushman rock art preserved at its main caves, and the game reserve is home of the eland as well as the bearded vulture and Cape vulture. The area is considered one of South Africa's many adventure areas, and attracts hikers, nature enthusiasts, and other tourists. It also hosts the Giant's Challenge marathon in April each year. The Treverton Grade 10s take a 15 day hike to summit this peak in their 3rd term.

Hiking Trails
There are in excess of 25 walks in the Giant's Castle Game Reserve. The  network of trails here includes  to  hikes, spanning from 1 hour to overnight.

There are currently 14 recognized escarpment passes in the region (listed north to south):
 Corner Pass  
 Around the Corner Pass (variation route on Corner Pass with alternative summit)
 Judge Pass 
 Gypaetus Pass (opened in September 2012)  
 Bannerman Pass
 Thumb Pass (opened in 1997) 
 North Hlubi Pass  
 South Hlubi Pass 
 Langalibalele Pass  
 Bond Pass (opened in 2014)  
 North Jarding/Jarateng Pass 
 Central Jarding/Jarateng Pass 
 South Jarding/Jarateng Pass 
 Giant's Castle Pass

References

External links
Giant's Castle Accommodation
Giants Castle National Park and private cottages

Giant's Castle pictorial online book
Giant's Castle from Drakensberg Tourism

Drakensberg
Mountains of KwaZulu-Natal
Tourist attractions in KwaZulu-Natal